Castle Union was the code name given to one of the tests in the Operation Castle series of United States nuclear tests. It was the first test of the TX-14 thermonuclear weapon (initially the "emergency capability" EC-14), one of the first deployed U.S. thermonuclear bombs.

An "Alarm Clock" device is a "dry" fusion bomb, using lithium deuteride fuel for the fusion stage of a "staged" fusion bomb, unlike the cryogenic liquid deuterium of the first-generation Ivy Mike fusion device.

It differed from the Castle Romeo "Runt" device, tested shortly before, in using highly enriched lithium (approximately 95% lithium-6; natural lithium is a mixture of lithium-6 and lithium-7 isotopes). The "Runt" device had 7.5% lithium-6 in the fusion fuel.

The test took place on April 26, 1954 at Bikini atoll of the Marshall Islands, on a barge moored in the lagoon, off Yurochi island. The yield of 6.9 megatons of TNT was somewhat higher than the predicted 3-4 megatons.

Like the Ivy Mike, Castle Bravo, and Castle Romeo tests, a large percentage of the yield was produced by fast fission of the natural uranium tamper, which contributed to the extensive fallout caused by these tests.

As the highly enriched lithium was both expensive and scarce at the time, it limited the number of these weapons that could be produced. The "Runt" design tested in Castle Romeo and Castle Yankee was preferred for deployment.

External links
 Wikimapia
 
 
 
 Operation Castle

References
 Chuck Hansen, U. S. Nuclear Weapons: The Secret History (Arlington: AeroFax, 1988)

Explosions in 1954
Nuclear testing at Bikini Atoll
1954 in military history
1954 in the environment
1950s in the Marshall Islands
1954 in the Trust Territory of the Pacific Islands
April 1954 events in Oceania